MyTravel Group plc was a British, global travel group headquartered in Rochdale, England. It was founded in 1972 as Airtours Group. The group included two in-house airlines, MyTravel Airways UK and MyTravel Airways Scandinavia, and various tour operators around the world. On 19 June 2007, the group merged with Thomas Cook AG to form the Thomas Cook Group plc.

The successor to MyTravel Group: Thomas Cook Group, entered Compulsory liquidation on 23 September 2019.

History 
The group was founded under the Airtours brand in 1972, when David Crossland purchased a series of small travel agencies in Lancashire, United Kingdom. The group began operating package holidays and launched its own in-house charter airline, in the early 1980s. It offered their first charter flights to the Caribbean in 1987 for just £299.

In 1994, Airtours purchased Scandinavian Leisure Group and in 1996 it bought Simon Spies Holding, a Danish rival.

In 2002, Airtours Group plc, rebranded under the new company-wide banner of MyTravel Group plc. This included a name change for Airtours International and Premiair to MyTravel Airways.

In November 2003, MyTravel sold off its North America Cruise Division to NLG (National Leisure Group) of Woburn, Massachusetts.

On 12 February 2007, MyTravel Group plc announced that they had agreed terms on a merger with Thomas Cook AG to form Thomas Cook Group plc.

Operations

Tour Operators

Airlines

References

Travel and holiday companies of the United Kingdom
British companies established in 1972
Transport companies established in 1972
Transport companies disestablished in 2007
Companies formerly listed on the London Stock Exchange
2007 mergers and acquisitions

fi:MyTravel